Henry I of Jawor (– 15 May 1346), was a duke of Jawor-Lwówek-Świdnica-Ziębice during 1301–1312 (with his brothers as co-rulers), sole Duke of Jawor-Lwówek since 1312 and Duke of Głogów since 1337 until his death.

He was the third son of Bolko I the Strict, Duke of Jawor-Lwówek-Świdnica-Ziębice, by his wife Beatrix, daughter of Otto V the Long, Margrave of Brandenburg-Salzwedel.

Life
On the death of his father in 1301, Henry I, his older brother Bernard and his younger brother Bolko II, inherited his domains; however, because they were still minors, Henry I and his siblings were placed under the care of their mother and their maternal uncle Herman, Margrave of Brandenburg-Salzwedel until 1305, when the older brother Bernard was declared an adult and assumed the government and the guardianship of his brothers.

By 1307 Henry I was considered old enough to participate actively in the government. In 1312 he was made the first division of the Duchy: Henry I took Jawor and Lwówek.

Following the model of his father and brother Bernard, Henry I tried to keep his political independence and refuse to submit to any of his powerful neighbors. To this end, he approached those who were opposed to King John in Bohemia, represented by the widow of King Wenceslaus II and daughter of the King Przemysł II of Poland, Elisabeth Richeza and her lover, the powerful magnate Henryk z Lipy.

In 1316 Queen Elisabeth, against the wishes of King John, made the betrothal of her only daughter, Princess Agnes of Bohemia, with Henry I, making him a potential competitor for the Bohemian crown against King John. Shortly after this, and with the consent of Queen Elisabeth, Henry I took with his troops her dower, Hradec Králové, where he organized expeditions in support of rebels against King John.  However, two years later, Henry I settled an agreement with King John, thanks to the mediation of the German king Louis IV, Henry I brother-in-law. Shortly after, Queen Elisabeth decided to sell her fiefs to King John.

In 1319 Waldemar, Margrave of Brandenburg-Stendal died without issue and with him, the branch of the House of Ascania who ruled Brandenburg since the 12th century, became extinct. Through his mother Beatrix, Henry I was one of the closest relatives of the late Margrave. Determined to obtain part of Waldemar's inheritance, he entered with troops and conquest the eastern Lusatia and Zgorzelec. At the same time, the western part of the district of Bautzen was taken by King John of Bohemia. The division was formally accepted by King Louis IV, who became in the sovereign of Brandenburg after Waldemar's death. However, the Bohemian King refused to accept the loss of part of Lusatia, so in August and September 1319 erupted a brief war, who ended with an arrangement for the disputed territory of September 22, that guarantees the status quo in the district.

Ten years later, part of Lusatia returned to Bohemia, when, for unknown reasons, the inhabitants of Zgorzelec asked the King to join the district to the Bohemian crown. Henry I eventually accepted and switched this land for the towns of Trutnov and Hradec Králové, who were granted by King John only during his lifetime.

After 1329 Henry I only retained the Lusatian towns of Lubań, Żytawa, and Przewóz. His possession over these lands ended in 1337 when after an agreement signed on 4 January in Wroclaw, he received from Bohemia in exchange for his lands in Lusatia, the Duchy of Głogów, but only during his lifetime. This arrangement also made Henry I an independent ally of the Bohemian crown, and one of the most powerful and notorious Silesian Dukes of the Piast dynasty. Shortly after, in exchange to obtain Kąty Wrocławskie, Henry I paid homage to the Bohemian King.

In 1319 Henry I formally married with Agnes (b. 15 June 1305 – d. 4 January 1337), the only child of King Wenceslaus II of Bohemia from his second marriage with Elisabeth Richeza of Poland. However, because they are related in the fourth degree of kinship, was necessary to obtain the Papal dispensation for the wedding, who was granted only in 1325. The couple remained childless, although Agnes did have a pregnancy, but she suffered a miscarriage in the first trimester when she rode with her horse over a hill, who caused that she kept in bed for many months.

Henry I died by 15 May 1346 and was buried in the Grüssau Abbey. Today, in Lwówek Śląski was conserved a silver tombstone, called "The Nun and the Knight" (rycerz i zakonnica), who apparently represented Henry I and his wife Agnes. Previously, the tombstone was in the Franciscan monastery of Lwówek.

References

|-

|-

|-

|-

1290s births
1346 deaths
Piast dynasty
Dukes of Poland